Zhangixalus prasinatus (common names: tributary flying frog, green treefrog, emerald green treefrog) is a species of frog in the family Rhacophoridae endemic to northern Taiwan. It is the largest tree frog in Taiwan; females can reach  in snout-vent length.  It is known from Taipei, Yilan, and Taoyuan.

Its habitats are orchards, tea plantations, bamboo forests, shrublands, and forests in hilly areas. Breeding takes place in tree holes, but also in cisterns, buckets, or water tanks. It is threatened by habitat loss and degradation.

See also
List of protected species in Taiwan
List of endemic species of Taiwan

References

prasinatus
Amphibians of Taiwan
Endemic fauna of Taiwan
Amphibians described in 1983
Taxonomy articles created by Polbot
Taxa named by Kuang-yang Lue